The year 2022 was the 29th year in the history of the Ultimate Fighting Championship (UFC), a mixed martial arts promotion based in the United States.

Despite the relaxation of COVID-19 pandemic restrictions, the promotion's UFC Apex continued hosting events with reduced crowds, with 18 events already held and two additional events scheduled.

Releases and retirements 
These fighters have either been released from their UFC contracts, announced their retirement or joined other promotions:

Alan Baudot - Released in July - Heavyweight
Alex da Silva Coelho - Released in June - Lightweight
Alex Oliveira - Welterweight - Contract not renewed in April
Alexey Oleynik - End of contract - Heavyweight
Alan Patrick - Released in August - Lightweight
Alessio Di Chirico - Retired in September - Middleweight
Alexis Davis - Contract not renewed in February - Women's Bantamweight
Andreas Michailidis - Released in June - Welterweight
Andre Ewell - Released in February - Featherweight
Askar Mozharov - Released in June - Light Heavyweight
Askar Askarov - Asked to be released - Flyweight
Aspen Ladd - Released in August - Women's Bantamweight
Austin Hubbard - Released in May - Lightweight
Ben Rothwell - Released in April - Heavyweight
Benito Lopez - Released in December - Bantamweight
Brad Riddell - Retirement in November
Brandon Jenkins - Released in May - Lightweight
Bruno Souza - Released in May - Featherweight
Cameron Else - Released in May - Bantamweight
Cameron Vancamp - Released in October - Lightweight
Carlos Felipe - Released in March - Heavyweight
Chas Skelly - Retired in February - Featherweight
Charlie Ontiveros - Released in October - Lightweight
Cláudio Silva - Released in August  - Welterweight
Collin Anglin - Released in February - Featherweight
Dakota Bush - Released in February - Lightweight
Dalcha Lungiambula - Released in December - Middleweight
Darian Weeks - Released in October Welterweight
Danilo Marques - Released - Light Heavyweight
Danny Chavez - Released in August - Featherweight
Davi Ramos - Request to be released granted - Lightweight
David Zawada - Released in February - Welterweight
Dean Barry - Released in May - Welterweight
Deron Winn - Released in December- Middleweight
Devonte Smith - Released in May - Lightweight
Dhiego Lima - Retired in February - Welterweight
Domingo Pilarte - Released in February - Bantamweight
Donald Cerrone - Retired in July - Welterweight
Dwight Grant - Released in July - Welterweight
Eddie Wineland - Retired in June - Bantamweight
Fabio Cherant - Released in March - Light Heavyweight
Felice Herrig - Retired in June - Women's Strawweight 
Felipe Colares -  Released in June - Bantamweight
Francisco Figueiredo Released in August - Flyweight
Frank Camacho - Released in June - Lightweight
Frankie Edgar - Retirement in November - Bantamweight
Gaetano Pirrello - Released in February - Bantamweight
Gina Mazany - Released in May - Women's Flyweight
Gloria de Paula - Released in June - Women's Strawweight
Greg Hardy - Released  in March - Heavyweight
Gustavo Lopez - Released in February - Bantamweight
Hannah Cifers - Released in June - Women's Strawweight
Harry Hunsucker - Released in August - Light Heavyweight
Hu Yaozong - Released in February - Middleweight
Hunter Azure - Released in March - Bantamweight
Ike Villanueva - Released in May - Light Heavyweight
Jared Gooden - Released in January - Welterweight
Jared Vanderaa - Released in December - Heavyweight
Jason Witt - Retired in November - Welterweight.
Jennifer Gonzalez - Released in February - Women's Flyweight
Jeremy Stephens - Contract not renewed in January - Lightweight
Jesse Strader - Released in May - Bantamweight
Jesse Ronson - Released in October - Lightweight
Jessica Eye - Retired in July - Women's Flyweight
Joanna Jędrzejczyk - Retired in June - Women's Strawweight
Joanne Wood - Released in July - Women's Flyweight
Jordan Williams - Released in February -  Welterweight
Karl Roberson - Released in July - Light Heavyweight
Kay Hansen - Released in April - Women's Strawweight 
Kazula Vargas - Released in May - Lightweight
Kevin Croom - Released in May - Bantamweight
Khalid Taha - Released in August - Bantamweight
Kris Moutinho - Released in May - Bantamweight
Krzysztof Jotko - Asked to be released - Middleweight
Louis Cosce - Released in October - Welterweight
Louis Smolka - Released in June - Bantamweight
Luigi Vendramini - Released in May -  Lightweight
Luke Rockhold - Retired in August - Middleweight
Magomed Mustafaev - Released in October - Lightweight
Maki Pitolo - Released in January - Middleweight
Mallory Martin - Contract not renewed in February - Women's Strawweight
Mark Striegl - Released in May - Featherweight
Marlon Moraes - Retired in April - Bantamweight
Mason Jones - Released in August - Lightweight
Matt Sayles - Released in January - Lightweight
Micheal Gillmore - Released in May - Welterweight
Mike Grundy - Released in May - Featherweight
Mickey Gall - Released in August -  Welterweight
Miranda Granger - Released in August - Women's Strawweight
Misha Cirkunov - Released in October - Light Heavyweight
Nate Diaz - Finished UFC contract in September- Welterweight
Nick Maximov - Released in October - Middleweight
Niklas Stolze - Released in June - Lightweight
Nina Nunes - Retired in August - Women's Flyweight
Poliana Botelho - Released in June - Women's Flyweight
Ramazan Emeev - Released in August - Welterweight
Randy Costa - Released in October - Bantamweight
Rogério Bontorin - Released in June - Flyweight
Rong Zhu - Released in May - Lightweight
Roxanne Modafferi - Retired in February - Women's Flyweight
Sabina Mazo - Released - Women's Flyweight
Shanna Young - Released in November - Women's Bantamweight 
Sam Alvey - Released in August - Middleweight
Sara McMann - Released in September - Women's Bantamweight
Sasha Palatnikov - Released in February - Welterweight
Sean Soriano - Released in February - Featherweight
Sergey Khandozhko - Retired in October - Welterweight
Shamil Gamzatov - Released in August   Light heavyweight
Shane Burgos - Signed with Professional Fighters League in August - Featherweight
Silvana Gómez Juárez - Released in November - Women's Strawweight
Timur Valiev - Did Not Re-Sign in June - Bantamweight
T.J. Laramie - Released in June - Featherweight
Tom Breese - Signed with Levels Fight League in January - Middleweight
Thiago Santos - Signed with Professional Fighters League in September - Light Heavyweight
Tristan Connelly - Released in June - Lightweight
Tony Kelley - Released in July - Bantamweight
Uriah Hall - Retired in August - Middleweight
Wu Yanan - Released in August - Women's Bantamweight
Youssef Zalal Released in August - Bantamweight
Zabit Magomedsharipov - Retired in June - Featherweight
Zarrukh Adashev - Released in June - Flyweight
Zviad Lazishvili - Released in March - Bantamweight

Debut UFC fighters 
The following fighters fought their first UFC fight in 2022:

AJ Dobson - UFC 271
A.J. Fletcher - UFC Fight Night 203
Aliaskhab Khizriev - UFC on ESPN 33
André Fialho - UFC 270
Ange Loosa - UFC on ESPN 34
Armen Petrosyan - UFC Fight Night 202
Askar Mozharov - UFC Fight Night 207 
Azamat Murzakanov - UFC Fight Night 203
Caio Borralho   UFC on ESPN 34
Cameron Saaiman - UFC 282
Cameron VanCamp - UFC 274
Carlos Candelario - UFC on ESPN 36
Carlos Mota - UFC Fight Night 213
Carlos Hernandez - UFC Fight Night 202
Chad Anheliger - UFC Fight Night 201
Charles Johnson - UFC Fight Night 208
Chidi Njokuani - UFC Fight Night 200
Christian Rodriguez - UFC Fight Night 201
C.J. Vergara - UFC 274
Daniel Argueta - UFC Fight Night 207
Daniel Santos - UFC 273
Dean Barry - UFC Fight Night 205
Denis Tiuliulin - UFC on ESPN 33
Denys Bondar - UFC Fight Night 200
Emily Ducote - UFC on ABC 3
Erik Silva - UFC 282
Evan Elder - UFC Fight Night 205
Fernie Garcia - UFC 274
Francis Marshall - UFC on ESPN 42
Gadzhi Omargadzhiev - UFC on ESPN 34
Genaro Valdéz - UFC 270
Hayisaer Maheshate - UFC 275
Jack Della Maddalena - UFC 270
Jailton Almeida - UFC Fight Night 200
Jake Hadley - UFC on ESPN 36
Jasmine Jasudavicius - UFC 270
Javid Basharat - UFC Fight Night 203
Jay Perrin - UFC Fight Night 201
Joanderson Brito - UFC on ESPN 32
Josh Fremd - UFC 273
Joshua Weems - UFC Fight Night 213
Joseph Holmes - UFC on ESPN 32
Josh Fremd - UFC 273
Karine Silva - UFC Fight Night 207
Kleydson Rodrigues - UFC 274
Manuel Torres - UFC on ESPN 36
Maria Oliveira - UFC on ESPN 37
Martin Buday - UFC on ESPN 34
Michael Morales - UFC 270
Mike Malott - UFC 273
Mike Mathetha - UFC 271
Muhammad Mokaev - UFC Fight Night 204
Natália Silva - UFC on ESPN 37
Nikolas Motta - UFC Fight Night 201
Pete Rodriguez - UFC 270
Piera Rodríguez - UFC 273
Ramona Pascual - UFC Fight Night 202
Raul Rosas Jr. - UFC 282
Rinat Fakhretdinov - UFC on ESPN 36
Saimon Oliveira - UFC 270
Steven Koslow - UFC 282
Tamires Vidal - UFC Fight Night 214
Tatsuro Taira - UFC on ESPN 36
Tresean Gore - UFC Fight Night 200
Tereza Bledá - UFC Fight Night 21
Trey Ogden - UFC on ESPN 34
Tresean Gore - UFC on ESPN 39
Viacheslav Borshchev - UFC on ESPN 32
Victor Altamirano - UFC Fight Night 202
Victor Henry - UFC 270

Suspended fighters 
The list below is based on fighters suspended either by (1) United States Anti-Doping Agency (USADA) or World Anti-Doping Agency (WADA) for violation of taking prohibited substances or non-analytical incidents, (2) by local commissions on misconduct during the fights or at event venues, or (3) by the UFC for reasons also stated below.

The Ultimate Fighter 
The following The Ultimate Fighter seasons are scheduled for broadcast in 2022:

Title fights

Events list 

1. Julian Erosa received Steven Peterson's Fight of the Night bonus due to Peterson missing weight.
2. Marlon Vera received Rob Font's Fight of the Night bonus due to Font missing weight.

See also 
 List of UFC champions
 List of UFC events
 List of current UFC fighters
 2022 in Bellator MMA
 2022 in ONE Championship
 2022 in Absolute Championship Akhmat
 2022 in Konfrontacja Sztuk Walki
 2022 in Rizin Fighting Federation
 2022 in AMC Fight Nights 
 2022 in Brave Combat Federation
 2022 in Road FC
 2022 in Professional Fighters League
 2022 in Eagle Fighting Championship
 2022 in Legacy Fighting Alliance
 2022 in combat sports

References

External links 
 UFC past events on UFC.com
 UFC events results at Sherdog.com

Ultimate Fighting Championship by year
UFC